The British Renegades Warning List was a list of people that the British security services suspected of assisting the Axis forces during the Second World War. It was sent to SHAEF (Supreme Headquarters Allied Expeditionary Force) on 6 May 1944 in advance of the Normandy landings on 6 June 1944 to enable Allied troops to identify people in occupied Europe who might try to subvert the invasion effort.

Names on the list
This is an incomplete list of the "renegades":
 Benson Railton Freeman (RAF flying instructor who served in the Waffen SS.
 No. 29 Susan Hilton (Pro-Nazi broadcaster)
 No. 80 Walter Purdy

See also
 List of Allied traitors during World War II

References

Treason
Collaborators with Nazi Germany
Operation Overlord